Scena (moth), genus of moths in the subfamily Arctiinae. 
 Scena, Italian name for the comune (municipality) of Schenna in South Tyrol in northern Italy,
 Scena, a sequence in an aria